Wander dos Santos Machado, commonly known as Formiga, (born 25 April 1976) is a retired footballer who played as a forward for clubs in Brazil, Albania and Greece.

Club career
Born in Goiânia, Formiga began playing football with Goiás Esporte Clube. He would play for Santa Cruz Futebol Clube, Clube Náutico Capibaribe and Sociedade Esportiva e Recreativa Caxias do Sul in the Copa do Brasil.

Formiga moved from Goiânia Esporte Clube to Albanian Superliga side KS Shkumbini Peqin in September 2002.

Formiga moved to Greece in July 2003, where he would play for Greek second division side Atromitos F.C. before moving to Greek first division side Chalkidona F.C. Formiga would also play in the second division for Pierikos F.C. and the third division for Olympiakos Volos F.C. and Korinthos F.C.  In the season 2007-08 he also played with FK Pelister in the First Macedonian Football League.

References

External links
Globo Esporte's Futpedia
Guardian's Stats Centre

1976 births
Living people
Brazilian footballers
Brazilian expatriate footballers
Goiás Esporte Clube players
Santa Cruz Futebol Clube players
Clube Náutico Capibaribe players
Sociedade Esportiva e Recreativa Caxias do Sul players
Goiânia Esporte Clube players
Atromitos F.C. players
Chalkidona F.C. players
Olympiacos Volos F.C. players
Pierikos F.C. players
Korinthos F.C. players
FK Pelister players
Expatriate footballers in Albania
Expatriate footballers in Greece
Expatriate footballers in North Macedonia
Association football forwards
Sportspeople from Goiânia